Tieshan Subdistrict is a subdistrict in Wugang, Pingdingshan, Henan, China. , it administers the following ten villages: 
Zhaoziying Village
Shuikengzhao Village
Zhongli Village
Baochong Village
Hanzhuang Village
Biandanli Village
Fuzhuang Village
Shangcao Village
Zhongcao Village
Qianzhang Village

See also 
 List of township-level divisions of Henan

References 

Township-level divisions of Henan
Wugang, Henan